Ibrahim Majid Abdullmajid (born on May 12, 1990) is a Qatari footballer. He currently plays as a central defender for Al Ahli and the Qatar national team. He was born in Kuwait, and is of a Palestinian descent.

Career
He used to be a striker when he played for Al Wakrah, then his coach in Al Sadd's youth team saw that he has the ability and the strength of a central defender.

He made his senior team debut for Al Sadd in 2007 against Al-Karamah SC.

Majid scored one of the winning penalties in the 2011 AFC Champions League final against Jeonbuk to help Al Sadd secure the continental title for the second time in its history. He also scored against Kashiwa Reysol in the penalty shoot-out during the third-place match of the 2011 FIFA Club World Cup.

International goals 
Last update: 13 November 2014.

References

External links 

1990 births
Living people
Qatari footballers
Qatar international footballers
Kuwaiti footballers
Qatari people of Kuwaiti descent
Qatari people of Palestinian descent
Kuwaiti people of Palestinian descent
Naturalised citizens of Qatar
Kuwaiti emigrants to Qatar
2007 AFC Asian Cup players
2011 AFC Asian Cup players
2015 AFC Asian Cup players
Qatar Stars League players
Sportspeople from Kuwait City
Palestinian emigrants to Qatar
Association football central defenders
Al-Wakrah SC players
Al Sadd SC players
Al-Arabi SC (Qatar) players
Al-Sailiya SC players
Al Ahli SC (Doha) players
FIFA Century Club